The Social Peace Party is a political party in Egypt that seeks a fair distribution of wealth and an independent judiciary.

References

2011 establishments in Egypt
Liberal parties in Egypt
Political parties established in 2011